Up in the Cellar is a 1970 American comedy film directed by Theodore J. Flicker and starring Wes Stern, Larry Hagman, Joan Collins, Judy Pace, David Cargo, and Joan Darling. The plot concerns a man who decides to bed three women.

It was described by AIP as "as near a sequel to Three in the Attic as possible" and was originally known as The Late Boy Wonder.

Plot
A suicidal college student is saved by a university president, against his wishes. To get even, the student decides to seduce women in the president's life, including his wife and mistress.

Cast
 Wes Stern as Colin Slade
 Joan Collins as Pat Camber
 Larry Hagman as Maurice Camber
 Judy Pace as Harlene

References

External links
 

1970 films
1970s English-language films
Films directed by Theodore J. Flicker